German University Bangladesh is a private University in Bangladesh. This university is known as GUB. The university is affiliated to the University Grants Commission. This university has four faculties offering more than 25-degree programs. Md. Ehsanul Habib, an official of Square Group, is the chairperson of the board of directors of German University Bangladesh.

History 
Saifullah Khandker, a Bangladeshi professor living in Germany, took the initiative to establish a German University in Bangladesh. His initial plan entailed establishing the university in Sakhipur in Tangail District. It was established in 2013 in Gazipur, Gazipur District. Saifullah Khandaker was the founding chairperson of the university.

In November 2016, the University Grants Commission said that certificates from the university would not be recognized due to the university having no vice-chancellor. Mesbahuddin Ahmed, the director of the university, was a leader of the Awami League backed blue panel of teachers at Dhaka University.

Professor Dr. Md. Shams-Ud-Din was appointed Vice-Chancellor of the University on 2 July 2018 by the President of Bangladesh Abdul Hamid. The pro-Vice Chancellors of the university are Dr. Thomas M. Klapoetke, Dr. Marie-Louise Klotz, Dr. Leo Brunnberg, and Dr. Cornelius Froemmel.

Undergraduate and graduate programs 
 B.Sc. in Food Science & Engineering
 B.Sc. in Computer Science & Engineering
 B.Sc. Hons. in Bio-Technology
 Bachelor of Human Health (similar to public health)
 BBA (Bachelor of Business Administration)
 BSS Hons. in Sociology (Bachelor in Sociology)
 BA Hons. in Economics (Bachelor in Economics)
 BS Hons. in BPA (Bachelor in Public Administration)
 BA Hons. in English (Bachelor in English)
 BS Hons. in BPA (Bachelor in Public Administration)
 BA Hons. in English (Bachelor in English)
 B.Sc. (Hons) in Environment Protection Technology
 B.Sc. in Food Science & Engineering

See also 
 Government University
 Private University
 National University

References

External links 
  
 University Grants Commission (Bangladesh)

Education in Bangladesh
2013 establishments in Bangladesh